Firecake or Fire cake was a type of quick bread eaten by soldiers in the French and Indian and the American Revolutionary Wars. They were made from a mixture of flour, water and salt and baked on a rock in the fire or in the ashes.

Ingredients
The firecake dough was made by mixing flour, water and salt, roughly in the proportions 2.3 parts flour to 1 part water, forming a thick damp dough.

Baking
The dough was formed into thick flat cakes the size of a hand. The cakes were then put on a flat stone and the stone was placed upright near the fire, or put in the ashes. After baking the firecakes were charred on the outside and doughy inside. For storage they were baked until dry and hard.

Usage
Firecakes were used as a not very popular substitute when the commissary failed to issue bread to the soldiers. They were then issued flour and had to make the bread themselves.

References

Quick breads
Military food
History of food and drink
18th-century history of the British Army
American Revolutionary War
French and Indian War